Djambu Barra Barra (also known as Sambo Barra Barra) (1946–2005) was an Indigenous Australian artist based in Ngukurr, in the Northern Territory of Australia. Ngukurr is considered to be an artistically significant community in Australia with a wide variety of diverse styles and artists, one of them being Barra Barra.

Biography 

Djambu Barra Barra was born around 1946 in Wagilak country near Nilipidgi on the Walker River. He was raised in the Wagilak community with no communication with the modern Western world. This was considered a unique upbringing compared to the other Ngukurr artists who grew up with contact to Europeans. Barra Barra moved out of the Wagilak community when his entire family was killed. He began traveling throughout Arnhem land where he was able to learn more about his culture – specifically, certain rituals, ceremonies and stories. Throughout his travels, he learned about a variety of Arnhem land art styles as well as about the ceremonial painting in different clans. This information he was able to carry with him and disseminate when he settled down in Ngukurr, a Northern Territory in Australia

Here, he met and married his wife, Amy Johnson. Barra Barra integrated himself in the Ngukurr community through his extensive knowledge of aboriginal ceremonies and culture. He eventually became the initiation and funeral director in Ngukurr due to his knowledge of ceremonies and his Wagilak upbringing (the Wagilak clan played a role in purification ceremonies at funerals at Ngukurr). Djambu Barra Barra was of the Dhuwa moiety, and was manager for a Yirritja moiety ceremony. In Aboriginal Australian culture, the universe is divided into two exogamous patrimoieties called Dhuwa and Yirritja, and being and thing belongs to one or the other. Moieties determine the animals, totems, and places which an individual is empowered to recreate artistically, as well as the type of person that they are allowed to marry. Because of Barra Barra's moiety, he was able to paint the plains kangaroo, the crocodile, the Guyal characters of Sandridge goanna, and devil devi, which all feature prominently in his paintings.

Career 
Djambu Barra Barra's career began in Ngukurr (a community located in south-eastern Arnhem Land along the Roper River) around 1987. He learned important ceremony and how to paint on bodies and bark as a young man, and was aware of painting styles from various parts of Arnhem. His heritage was Yolngu, but his art resembles that of central and western Arnhem Land traditions more closely.

Barra Barra, along with other soon to be prominent  artist like Ginger Riley Manduwalawala, took part in a printmaking course at Ngukurr arts in 1986. Barra Barra and Manduwalawala decided that they wanted to focus on painting, and took to applying screen printing ink directly onto curtain material with brushes. This course helped to develop Barra Barra's techniques and begin his road to being an established artist. The artists' works centred around their expressive use of colour and their knack for innovation. Specifically, these Ngukurr artists became known for their use of acrylic paint on canvas. This traditionally Western medium of art allowed for the group's art to stand out amongst other aboriginal artists. Barra Barra headed this experimentation as he explored techniques for producing art while drawing on his multitude of influences from the many different tribes of Arnhem land. The result was a striking combination of tradition and innovation making Barra Barra a famously, unique artist in his field.

Barra Barra's early works tended to be physically massive and demonstrated an obvious confidence in subject matter. His early work, Crocodile Story (1987) was featured in the 4th National Aboriginal Art Award held at the Museum and Art Gallery of the Northern Territory. The work featured a crooked canvas shape, and a deviation from the traditional square format. About the work, Barra Barra said "The crocodile has creative thoughts, like humans. He knows how heavy the floods will be. He builds a very clever nest. His eyes are no longer eyes. They are fire".

He was best known for his use of bright, bold colours and traditional designs, even being recorded to ask for "fluoro colours" in 1987 He was also able to render rarrk—a traditional cross-hatching design—in acrylic paint. His compositions were typically dense and dominated by large figurative forms. His style often also saw symmetrical and circular backgrounds which draw attention to the central figures—especially in depictions of ceremony. Many of his paintings are in the figurative tradition, and feature ancestral beings and mortuary scenes, as well as iterations of both his and his mother's dreamings (kangaroo, crocodile). Yolngu art can be generally divided into two representational groups: figurative and geometric. The figurative system consists of iconically motivated images—meaning that there is a similarity between the signifier and the signified. Djambu also painted "big corroboree stories" relating to various ceremonies. A recurring figure in these ritual paintings was the devil devil, also called Nakaran. He is depicted as a giant man and sorcery figure with magic powers.

He was also known to have collaborated with his wife, Amy Jirwulurr Johnson, for nearly 20 years. Amy was born on Roper River and was taught about Aboriginal culture by her mother. Amy used similar bold contrasting colours as her husband, with a focus on primary colours and usually depicting animals and plants with meticulous detail. Her and Djambu were part of numerous group exhibitions at Alcaston Gallery in Melbourne from 1989-1997. Their work shared some motifs and stylistic trends, although Amy Johnson's work presents portrays animals from her mother's country rather than the ancestral figures and totems found in her husband's work.

Ngukurr Arts 
Ngukurr originated from an Anglian mission by the Church Missionary Society in 1908. It was officially known as the Roper River Mission, and focused on establishing industrial, agricultural, educational, and spiritual foundations in the community. The indigenous population of this community fluctuated as people moved in and away from the new establishment often. The European missionaries negatively valued Aboriginal Australian culture. In 1968 the Welfare Branch of the Northern Territory assumed control of the settlement, and government policies began to swing away from assimilation.

Ngukurr Arts refers to the collaborative art community that formed at Roper River. The art community was formed as a way of integrating the number of aboriginal cultures present in the area. The community is known for its lack of cohesion amongst artists/styles who all come together as a group based on their passion for innovation.  Furthermore, the artists all use bright, striking colours in their works. This dynamic style makes it hard to define Ngukurr Arts in any specific way as the Roper River artists strive to differentiate themselves from previously established aboriginal tradition. Despite these differences, Ngukurr Art provided the artists with a workspace as well as a community for collaboration. This social network allowed for many of the artists to then rise to fame in the global art market.

The Ngukurr arts initiative organized field trips to other art centers, secured continuous fundraising for artists, organized exhibitions, and taught principles of distribution, marketing, and management Ngukurr Arts has been in long time conversation with Anthony and Beverly Knight, the directors of the Alcaston Gallery in Melbourne. The Knights were taken with specifically Ginger Riley's works and purchased them all. Many of these works are now featured in the National Gallery of Victoria. This level of investment and interaction helped to gain publicity for the Roper River artists in the western art markets.

Roper River artists 
Some other artists include Ginger Riley Manduwalawala Willie Gudabi, Moima Willie, Gertie Huddleston and Amy Jirwulurr Johnson.

Global art market (1980s–present) 
The 20th century was a period of innovation as a whole for the arts.  Many movements around the world were driven by the idea of "new" and "now" as artists wanted to achieve something different from what has been done in the past. Movements like Pop Art and other post-modernist movements focused on innovation to create something different than the movements that came before it. Specifically, Pop Art also focused on reinvention of traditional motifs through new methods of expression like screen printing.They also focused on using bright colours to instil a new artistic voice within repurposed figures, much like the Ngukurr artists did with their artworks. A lot of the success of the Roper River artists, including Barra Barra, can be attributed to the receptive culture surrounding innovation and uniqueness.

Legacy 

Barra Barra was also an important ceremony man in his community, conducting both initiation and funeral ceremonies in his later years. The population and culture of the  Roper River region had been previously decimated by the pastoral industry brought about by colonialism; this meant that many people no longer had access to their heritage, and there was little stylistic continuity in the region. Barra Barra helped to rejuvenate the traditions of this area and stimulate the art industry through his involvement in the Ngukurr Adult Education Committee and participation in that initiative's first classes. Also, the information he brought to the Ngukurr area from his vast travels through Arnhem land, in the form of ceremony, songs, and art styles, helped was invaluable in the reconnection to traditions in the wake of colonialism.

Barra Barra epitomizes the blend of innovation and tradition that the Roper River artists center themselves around. Barra Barra's style is special in the fact that it draws on influence from so many places which he expresses as a singular, cohesive artistic voice. He is revered for his exceptional ability in translating rarrk to acrylic paints on canvas. His passion for innovation and ease with experimenting has made him a standout artist amongst contemporary aboriginal artists as a whole.

Works

Collections 
 National Gallery of Australia
 National Gallery of Victoria
 University of Wollongong
Kluge-Ruhe Aboriginal Art Collection of the University of Virginia

Significant exhibitions 
 1987: National Aboriginal and Torres Strait Islander Art Award, Darwin
 1987: Beat Strit – 10 years on, Melbourne
 1989-1987: group shows at Alcaston Gallery (endorsed by Beverly Knight), Melbourne
 1992: group show at Christine Abrahams Gallery (through Alcaston House), Melbourne
 1992, 1995, 1996: group shows at Hogarth Gallery (through Alcaston House), Sydney
 1994: group show at Gallerie Australis (through Alcaston House), Adelaide
 1998: Devil Devil. Alcaston Gallery, Melbourne
 1999: Daily Life in Ngukurr: Sambo Barra Barra and Amy Johnson. Rebecca Hosack Art Gallery, London.
 2004-5: Colour Power: Aboriginal Art Post 1984. National Gallery of Victoria, Melbourne.
 2009-2010: Colour Country: Art from the Roper River. Wagga Wagga Art Gallery, Wagga Wagga; Flinders University Art Museum, Adelaide; Drill Hall Gallery, Australian National University, Canberra; Museum and Art Gallery of the Northern Territory, Darwin.

Further reading 
 "Conference Paper: Luminous Bones, Djambu Barra Barra and the devil devil" by Cath Bowdler, Ancestral Power and the Aesthetic Conference, Melbourne, November 2011 https://cathbowdler.net/portfolio/conference-paper-luminous-bones-djambu-barra-barra-and-the-devil-devil/
 "Colour Country: Art from Roper River" Education Kit by Wagga Art Gallery https://waggaartgallery.com.au/__data/assets/pdf_file/0004/8473/CC_ed_Kit.pdf
 "Colour Country: Art from Roper River" by Cath Bowdler https://cathbowdler.files.wordpress.com/2018/12/11CC_Catalogue-PDF2009.pdf

References 

Australian Aboriginal artists
Australian contemporary artists
20th-century Australian artists
21st-century Australian artists
Artists from the Northern Territory